General Andranik formerly Hoktemberyan, is a Yerevan Metro station. It was opened to the public on 26 December, 1989.

References

Yerevan Metro stations
Railway stations opened in 1989
1989 establishments in the Soviet Union